In classical electromagnetism, polarization density (or electric polarization, or simply polarization) is the vector field that expresses the density of permanent or induced electric dipole moments in a dielectric material. When a dielectric is placed in an external electric field, its molecules gain electric dipole moment and the dielectric is said to be polarized. The electric dipole moment induced per unit volume of the dielectric material is called the electric polarization of the dielectric.

Polarization density also describes how a material responds to an applied electric field as well as the way the material changes the electric field, and can be used to calculate the forces that result from those interactions. It can be compared to magnetization, which is the measure of the corresponding response of a material to a magnetic field in magnetism. The SI unit of measure is coulombs per square meter, and polarization density is represented by a vector P.

Definition

An external electric field that is applied to a dielectric material, causes a displacement of bound charged elements. These are elements which are bound to molecules and are not free to move around the material. Positive charged elements are displaced in the direction of the field, and negative charged elements are displaced opposite to the direction of the field. The molecules may remain neutral in charge, yet an electric dipole moment forms.

For a certain volume element  in the material, which carries a dipole moment , we define the polarization density :

In general, the dipole moment  changes from point to point within the dielectric. Hence, the polarization density  of a dielectric inside an infinitesimal volume dV with an infinitesimal dipole moment  is:

The net charge appearing as a result of polarization is called bound charge and denoted .

This definition of polarization density as a "dipole moment per unit volume" is widely adopted,
though in some cases it can lead to ambiguities and paradoxes.

Other expressions

Let a volume  be isolated inside the dielectric. Due to polarization the positive bound charge  will be displaced a distance  relative to the negative bound charge , giving rise to a dipole moment . Substitution of this expression in  yields

Since the charge  bounded in the volume  is equal to  the equation for  becomes:

where  is the density of the bound charge in the volume under consideration. It is clear from the definition above that the dipoles are overall neutral, that  is balanced by an equal density of the opposite charge within the volume. Charges that are not balanced are part of the free charge discussed below.

Gauss's law for the field of P

For a given volume  enclosed by a surface , the bound charge  inside it is equal to the flux of  through  taken with the negative sign, or

Differential form

By the divergence theorem, Gauss's law for the field P can be stated in differential form as:

where  is the divergence of the field P through a given surface containing the bound charge density .

Relationship between the fields of P and E

Homogeneous, isotropic dielectrics

In a homogeneous, linear, non-dispersive and isotropic dielectric medium, the polarization is aligned with and proportional to the electric field E:

Note that in this case  simplifies to a scalar, although more generally it is a tensor. This is a particular case due to the isotropy of the dielectric.

Taking into account this relation between P and E, equation becomes:

Therefore,

which can be written in terms of free charge and bound charge densities (by considering the relationship between the charges, their volume charge densities and the given volume):

Since within a homogeneous dielectric there can be no free charges , by the last equation it follows that there is no bulk bound charge in the material . And since free charges can get as close to the dielectric as to its topmost surface, it follows that polarization only gives rise to surface bound charge density (denoted  to avoid ambiguity with the volume bound charge density ).

where  is the normal vector to the surface  pointing outwards. (see charge density for the rigorous proof)

Anisotropic dielectrics

The class of dielectrics where the polarization density and the electric field are not in the same direction are known as anisotropic materials.

In such materials, the -th component of the polarization is related to the -th component of the electric field according to:

This relation shows, for example, that a material can polarize in the x direction by applying a field in the z direction, and so on. The case of an anisotropic dielectric medium is described by the field of crystal optics.

As in most electromagnetism, this relation deals with macroscopic averages of the fields and dipole density, so that one has a continuum approximation of the dielectric materials that neglects atomic-scale behaviors. The polarizability of individual particles in the medium can be related to the average susceptibility and polarization density by the Clausius–Mossotti relation.

In general, the susceptibility is a function of the frequency  of the applied field. This reflects the fact that the dipoles in the material cannot respond instantaneously to the applied field, and causality considerations lead to the Kramers–Kronig relations.

If the polarization P is not linearly proportional to the electric field , the medium is termed nonlinear and is described by the field of nonlinear optics.  To a good approximation (for sufficiently weak fields, assuming no permanent dipole moments are present), P is usually given by a Taylor series in  whose coefficients are the nonlinear susceptibilities:

In ferroelectric materials, there is no one-to-one correspondence between P and E at all because of hysteresis.

Polarization density in Maxwell's equations

The behavior of electric fields, magnetic fields, charge density and current density are described by Maxwell's equations in matter.

Relations between E, D and P

In terms of volume charge densities, the free charge density  is given by

where  is the total charge density.

This is known as the constitutive equation for electric fields.  Here  is the electric permittivity of empty space.  In this equation, P is the (negative of the) field induced in the material when the "fixed" charges, the dipoles, shift in response to the total underlying field E, whereas D is the field due to the remaining charges, known as "free" charges.

In general,  varies as a function of  depending on the medium, as described later in the article.

Therefore, a polarized medium, by way of Green's Theorem can be split into four components.

 The bound volumetric charge density: 
 The bound surface charge density: 
 The free volumetric charge density: 
 The free surface charge density:

Time-varying polarization density
When the polarization density changes with time, the time-dependent bound-charge density creates a polarization current density of

so that the total current density that enters Maxwell's equations is given by

where Jf is the free-charge current density, and the second term is the magnetization current density (also called the bound current density), a contribution from atomic-scale magnetic dipoles (when they are present).

Polarization ambiguity

Crystalline materials 
The polarization inside a solid is not, in general, uniquely defined. Because a bulk solid is periodic, one must choose a unit cell in which to compute the polarization (see figure). In other words, two people, Alice and Bob, looking at the same solid, may calculate different values of P, and neither of them will be wrong. For example, if Alice chooses a unit cell with positive ions at the top and Bob chooses the unit cell with negative ions at the top, their computed P vectors will have opposite directions. Alice and Bob will agree on the microscopic electric field E in the solid, but disagree on the value of the displacement field . 

On the other hand, even though the value of P is not uniquely defined in a bulk solid, variations in P are uniquely defined. If the crystal is gradually changed from one structure to another, there will be a current inside each unit cell, due to the motion of nuclei and electrons. This current results in a macroscopic transfer of charge from one side of the crystal to the other, and therefore it can be measured with an ammeter (like any other current) when wires are attached to the opposite sides of the crystal. The time-integral of the current is proportional to the change in P. The current can be calculated in computer simulations (such as density functional theory); the formula for the integrated current turns out to be a type of Berry's phase. 

The non-uniqueness of P is not problematic, because every measurable consequence of P is in fact a consequence of a continuous change in P. For example, when a material is put in an electric field E, which ramps up from zero to a finite value, the material's electronic and ionic positions slightly shift. This changes P, and the result is electric susceptibility (and hence permittivity). As another example, when some crystals are heated, their electronic and ionic positions slightly shift, changing P. The result is pyroelectricity. In all cases, the properties of interest are associated with a change in P.

Even though the polarization is in principle non-unique, in practice it is often (not always) defined by convention in a specific, unique way. For example, in a perfectly centrosymmetric crystal, P is exactly zero due to symmetry reasoning.

This can be seen in a pyroelectric material. Above the Curie temperature the material is not polarized and it has a centrosymmetric configuration. Lowering the temperature below the Curie temperature induces a structural phase transition that breaks the centrosymmetricity.  The P of the material grows proportionally to the distortion, thus allowing to define it unambiguously.

Amorphous materials 
Another problem in the definition of P is related to the arbitrary choice of the "unit volume", or more precisely to the system's scale. For example, at microscopic scale a plasma can be regarded as a gas of free charges, thus P should be zero. On the contrary, at a macroscopic scale the same plasma can be described as a continuous medium, exhibiting a permittivity  and thus a net polarization .

See also
Crystal structure
Ferroelectricity
Electret
Polarization (disambiguation)

References and notes

External links

Electric and magnetic fields in matter